The 1879 Kentucky gubernatorial election was held on August 4, 1879. Democratic nominee Luke P. Blackburn defeated Republican nominee Walter Evans with 55.43% of the vote.

General election

Candidates
Major party candidates
Luke P. Blackburn, Democratic
Walter Evans, Republican 

Other candidates
Charles W. Cook, Greenback

Results

References

1879
Gubernatorial
Kentucky